is a Japanese manga series by Midori Endō, serialized in Square Enix's Gangan Joker since 2011. It has been collected in 12 (plus 1) tankōbon volumes until 2016 when it ended. An anime television series adaptation by TMS Entertainment aired in Japan from October to December 2014.

Plot
Kohina Ichimatsu is an expressionless elementary school girl who lives alone, proclaims herself to be a doll, and eats nothing but instant noodles. One day, she plays the Kokkuri game by herself and summons the fox spirit Kokkuri-san who, upon seeing her unhealthy lifestyle, takes it upon himself to become her guardian and raise her properly. Thus starts Kohina's new life of being haunted by various unique spirits.

Characters

Main characters

Kohina is an emotionless girl living by herself in a house. She explains her lack of emotions and normal responses by claiming to be a living doll. She is obsessed with cup noodles, even having a wide variety of special edition noodles that she had hidden away until Kokkuri-san confiscated them and returned them to the store. She is usually seen in her chibi form and possessing rectangular shaped eyes.
Narrator

A handsome fox spirit who was summoned by Kohina. He knew Kohina before this incident as Kohina would often visit his shrine, despite its ruined state. After seeing how she lives as a 'doll' and wanting to help her, Kokkuri began to haunt Kohina. Convinced that her current life wasn't suitable for a young girl, he became her legal guardian. He often fights with Inugami over Kohina and her affections. Despite being an ancient spirit, Kokkuri has adjusted to modern life with incredible ease.

A dog spirit who adores Kohina because she was the only person to acknowledge Inugami when they were still a real dog. This leads to Kokkuri-san and Inugami often fighting with one another. Inugami owns a pair of handguns that they use when angered or challenged, and can even use them when in their tiny dog form.

An old tanuki spirit who is very lazy, drinks a lot, and is determined to keep his NEET lifestyle intact. At some point in the past he was once Kokkuri-san's roommate. Despite his bad behavior, he can't stand to see someone in trouble, especially girls and children. For example, Shigaraki used his pachinko winnings to fund an orphanage inhabited by the children whose families he ruined financially. He also cares for Kohina deeply and allowed a violent spirit she had befriended to curse him so that she wouldn't have to see him kill it. He appears to be interested in both Kokkuri-san and Inugami's female forms. Shigaraki occasionally dresses as Kohina, and his tanuki form was once taken to be so real (and scary) that he later changed the appearance to be cuter so he would be more popular.

Other characters

A cat spirit who is the poster girl for a failing traditional sweets shop. She has a strong obsession with dolls, which leads to a stalker-like fixation on Kohina. Her store is destitute because of her massive collection of broken and haunted dolls as well as all of her sweets being tailored to her tastes rather than that of any of her customers.

Kohina's classmate who is described as a shy tsundere. Having never had a friend in her life, Jimeko's attempts to get Kohina to be her friend led her to become a self-proclaimed bully who often puts flowers on Kohina's desk.

A student from Kohina's school, who resembles a Grey alien. He looks and behaves very much like an alien, and Kokkuri believes him to be one, but Kohina is convinced that he is a "normal Earthling." Although he appears to be an alien, he is friendly and interacts with his schoolmates normally.

A tengu spirit who is well-versed in local history, although he is only willing to assist Kokkuri-san in exchange for pictures of cup noodles.

The ghost of a woman who is bound to the maple tree where she waited for her boyfriend to return. She later discovers her boyfriend was reborn as the very same tree.

Media

Manga
Gugure! Kokkuri-san

Gugure! Shigaraki-san

Anime
An anime television series adaptation by TMS Entertainment aired in Japan between October 5, 2014 and December 21, 2014 and was simulcast by Crunchyroll.

Episode list

References

External links
 
Anime official website 

Anime series based on manga
Comedy anime and manga
Gangan Comics manga
Sentai Filmworks
Shinto kami in anime and manga
Shōnen manga
Supernatural anime and manga
TMS Entertainment
TV Tokyo original programming
Yonkoma
Works about adoption